Anoosheh Ashoori is a British–Iranian businessman formerly detained in Evin jail in Iran. Iranian authorities arrested Ashoori in August 2017, when he was in the  country to visit his mother. In August 2019, the Iranian judiciary sentenced Ashoori to 12 years in prison; 10 years for allegedly "spying for Israel's Mossad" and two years for "acquiring illegitimate wealth", charges which Ashoori denies.

Ashoori spent 10 years in the UK from 1972, while he studied mechanical and aeronautical engineering, returning to Iran to take care of his ailing father. He returned to the UK in 2005 to "expand his business abroad". British academics and Ashoori's family have stated that Ashoori's detention, and that of other jailed Iranian dual citizens, is connected to diplomatic disputes between Iran and the UK. Ashoori described his life in Evin jail in an article in The Guardian.

Ashoori, and Nazanin Zaghari-Ratcliffe, were released on 16 March 2022.

See also
 Iran–United Kingdom relations
 List of foreign nationals detained in Iran

References

Living people
Year of birth missing (living people)
People convicted of spying for Israel
British people imprisoned in Iran
Iranian emigrants to the United Kingdom
Iranian businesspeople
British businesspeople
Naturalised citizens of the United Kingdom